The Queensland United Party was the name of the Queensland state branch of the Nationalist Party of Australia in the mid-1920s. Its members contested one state election under this name, the 1923 election, in which it saw limited electoral success. It was led by Charles Taylor, the MP for Windsor.

The QUP gained 3 seats from its previous election result, and won a 10% swing to it in primary votes, but failed to defeat the incumbent Labor government led by Ted Theodore.

Following the election, in 1925, the United Party merged with the Country Party to become the Country and Progressive National Party (or CPNP) to contest the next election.

See also 

 1923 Queensland state election
 Nationalist Party of Australia
 Australian Country Party (1920)

References 

Defunct political parties in Queensland